The Reef Hotel Casino or Pullman Reef Hotel Casino is the only casino in Cairns, Queensland, Australia.

The hotel has 128 hotel rooms and is jointly owned by Casinos Austria International Limited and Accor Casino Investments (Australia) Pty. Ltd.

The complex features a central LED pillar and interactive floor which is prominent next to BAR36. The bar hosts free live entertainment 5 nights a week and serves food from 4pm-8pm every night. The Reef Hotel Casino also houses the Merchant Artisan Food & Coffee cafe plus four restaurants: Tamarind, Café China Noodle Bar (in the former Cairns Customs House), Cafe China Restaurant and Flinders Bar & Grill. It also hosts the Cairns Zoom & Wildlife Dome the rooftop. The Cairns Zoom & Wildlife Dome features a number of native Australian species including koalas, sugar gliders, red-legged pademelons, rufous bettongs, saltwater crocodiles, freshwater crocodiles, water monitor, scrub python, eastern short-neck turtle, red-tailed black cockatoos, double-eyed fig parrots, tawny frogmouths, laughing kookaburras and many other species.

History
January 1992. The Queensland Government called for submissions from interested parties to build and operate a casino in Cairns.
January 1996. Casino licence granted.  Reef Casino Hotel commenced trading on 31 January.

References

External links

 

1996 establishments in Australia
Casinos completed in 1996
Hotels established in 1996
Buildings and structures in Cairns
Casinos in Queensland
Hotels in Cairns
Casino hotels
Tourist attractions in Cairns
Cairns City, Queensland
Zoos in Queensland